Sing Me a Song of Texas is a 1945 American Western film directed by Vernon Keays and written by J. Benton Cheney and Elizabeth Beecher. The film stars Rosemary Lane, Tom Tyler, Guinn "Big Boy" Williams, Slim Summerville, Carole Mathews, Noah Beery Sr., Pinky Tomlin and Marie Austin. The film was released on February 8, 1945, by Columbia Pictures.

Plot

Production
The film features Noah Beery Sr.'s final role in a motion picture.

Cast          
Rosemary Lane as Laurie Lang
Tom Tyler as Steve Andrews
Guinn "Big Boy" Williams as Big Boy
Slim Summerville as Happy
Carole Mathews as Hilda Cartwright
Noah Beery Sr. as Charley Bronson 
Pinky Tomlin as himself
Marie Austin as Trudy Hobbs 
Ken Trietsch as Hoosier Hot Shot Ken 
Paul Trietsch as Hoosier Hot Shot Hessie 
Charles Ward as Hoosier Hot Shot Gabe
Gil Taylor as Hoosier Hot Shot Gil 
Hal McIntyre as Orchestra Leader
Foy Willing as Guitar Player Jim

References

External links
 

1945 films
American Western (genre) films
1945 Western (genre) films
Columbia Pictures films
Films directed by Vernon Keays
American black-and-white films
1940s English-language films
1940s American films